Taarlo is a village in the Dutch province of Drenthe. It is a part of the municipality of Tynaarlo, and lies about 5 km northeast of Assen.

The village was first mentioned in 820 as Arlo. The etymology is unclear. Taarlo is an esdorp to the south of Tynaarlo. It has a triangular brink (village square) with a pond which was used as a water supply.

Taarlo was home to 73 people in 1840.

References

Populated places in Drenthe
Tynaarlo